The Alène is a  long river in the Nièvre department in central France. It flows generally west.

Communes along its course
This list is ordered from source to mouth: 
Nièvre: Poil, Millay, Luzy, Fléty, Avrée, Sémelay, Rémilly, Fours, Thaix, Cercy-la-Tour

References

Rivers of France
Rivers of Bourgogne-Franche-Comté
Rivers of Nièvre